Glyphidocera glowackae is a moth in the family Autostichidae. It was described by Adamski and Brown in 2001. It is found in Venezuela.

The length of the forewings is 10.9-12.2 mm. The forewing colour consists of pale brownish orange intermixed with several brown scales. There are two brown discal spots, one near the base and the other near the apical end. There is one brown spot basad to the spot near the base of the cell and the marginal scales are brown. The hindwings are pale brown, the area posterior to the cubitus with some elongate scales.

Etymology
The species is named in honor of Anna Margaret Glowacka DeCorleto.

References

Moths described in 2001
Taxa named by David Adamski
Glyphidocerinae